Carroll County may refer to

 Carroll County, Arkansas
 Carroll County, Georgia
 Carroll County, Illinois
 Carroll County, Indiana
 Carroll County, Iowa
 Carroll County, Kentucky
 Carroll County, Maryland
 Carroll County, Mississippi
 Carroll County, Missouri
 Carroll County, New Hampshire
 Carroll County, Ohio
 Carroll County, Tennessee
 Carroll County, Virginia

See also
 "The Carroll County Accident",  a 1968 country and western song written by Bob Ferguson and recorded by Porter Wagoner
 East Carroll Parish, Louisiana
 West Carroll Parish, Louisiana
 Carroll County Airport (disambiguation)
 Carroll County Courthouse (disambiguation)
 Carroll County High School (disambiguation)
 Carroll County Public Schools (disambiguation)